Ingebrigt Johansson (24 October 1904 in Narvik – 24 April 1987 in Oslo) was a Norwegian mathematician.  He developed the symbolic logic system known as minimal logic.

Biography
Johansson was born in Narvik, Norway on October 24, 1904 as the son of bricklayer Isak Johansson (1849-1941) and Gjertrud Kletten (1865-1948). In 1941 he married Gidske Jacoba Schult (1908-1994). He died in Oslo, Norway on April 24, 1987.

In 1923 Johansson entered the University of Oslo to study mathematics. After he received his Candidatus realium degree in 1928 he continued his studies in Bonn in 1929 and in Frankfurt a.M. in 1930-1931. In 1931 he received his doctorate (Dr. philos) from the University of Oslo for his dissertation "Topologische Untersuchungen über unverzweigte Überlagerungsflächen".

He spent his professional career at the University of Oslo, from 1931 to 1936 as a fellow in geometry, from 1936 to 1942 as a lecturer in descriptive geometry and finally as a professor of mathematics from 1946 (his appointment dated from 1942). From 1935 to 1946 Johansson served as president of the Norwegian Mathematical Society. He was elected to the Norwegian Academy of Science and Letters in 1937.

He put great effort into mathematical didactics, experimenting with new methods in teaching and introducing new exam forms such as critique and comment tasks. He also wrote several textbooks and worked on curriculum reforms for the Oslo mathematics faculty.

References

External links 
 Matematikklærerne ved Universitetet i Oslo

1904 births
1987 deaths
20th-century  Norwegian mathematicians
Norwegian people of Swedish descent
People from Narvik
Presidents of the Norwegian Mathematical Society